Laurin Heinrich (born 26 September 2001) is a German racing driver who competes for SSR Huber Racing in the Porsche Supercup. He was selected as the 2022 Porsche Junior following the shootout at MotorLand Aragón.

Career

Early career
Heinrich began karting at the age of eight, initially as a hobby, before taking on the sport competitively as he grew older. As a child, Heinrich had aspirations of being a pilot rather than a racing driver, hence his early treatment of motorsports. After scoring titles in Swissauto kart competitions in his youth, Heinrich later cited his early aspirations as moving into Formula 4, which he fulfilled in 2017. At the age of 15, Heinrich entered the 2017 ADAC Formula 4 Championship with his family team, dubbed Heinrich Motorsport. In his rookie season of Formula 4 competition, the small outfit struggled, with Heinrich finishing no higher than 14th overall in a race and electing to forego the final round of the season at the Hockenheimring. Heinrich wouldn't return to single-seater competition the following season, and didn't return to professional racing until 2019.

Porsche competition
In 2019, Heinrich took part in the Porsche Sports Cup Germany, claiming the 5E class title with six victories from ten races. In September, Heinrich made his debut in the Porsche Carrera Cup Germany, taking part in the Sachsenring round with CarTech Motorsport. The following season, Heinrich began competing full-time in the series, driving for T3/HRT Motorsport. In September's joint-race between the German and French Carrera Cup competitions at Circuit de la Sarthe, Heinrich claimed his first podium in the German championship. He would secure three additional overall podiums that season, three of which occurred during the triple-header at the Red Bull Ring, finishing fourth in the overall points classification. He also secured the Rookie title, awarded to drivers taking part in the full-time championship for the first time. Heinrich also made his debut in the Porsche Supercup during the 2020 season, making two guest starts at the Red Bull Ring for MRS GT-Racing after one of the team's drivers was unable to enter the country due to COVID-19-related travel restrictions. Heinrich placed tenth in both events, but didn't score championship points as he was registered as a guest driver.

For 2021, Heinrich embarked on a dual program in both the globe-trotting Porsche Supercup and domestic Porsche Carrera Cup Germany, taking on both series with Huber Racing. Heinrich enjoyed an impressive rookie season in the former championship, taking his first ever Supercup victory at Zandvoort in September. Heinrich claimed additional podium finishes at Spa and Monza, finishing fourth in the overall championship and highest in the Rookie class. Domestically, Heinrich claimed his first Carrera Cup Germany victory in 2021 as well, taking overall honors in the second race at Oschersleben. During the next round at the Red Bull Ring, Heinrich claimed his second race victory and took the championship lead heading into the round at Monza. He would finish the season with eight total podiums from 15 races, taking fourth in the championship. At the end of 2021, Heinrich was selected to compete in the Porsche Junior Shootout at MotorLand Aragón. At the end of the competition, Heinrich was named as Porsche's Junior driver for the 2022 season, which featured a €225,000 scholarship towards a drive in the 2022 Porsche Supercup.

Heinrich began his Porsche Junior campaign with a drive in the Dubai 24 Hour, taking part in the 992 Am class with Huber Racing. 2022 saw Heinrich return to both the Porsche Supercup and Carrera Cup Germany, once again driving for Huber Racing. His Supercup campaign featured once race victory, at Silverstone, and four total podium finishes, taking a career-best third in the championship. The Carrera Cup Germany, however, saw Heinrich feature early and often at the front of the field. Over 16 races, Heinrich claimed six race victories, including a weekend sweep at Spa and the Sachsenring. After his double victory at the Sachsenring round, Heinrich secured the series championship with two races to spare. At the end of the 2022 season, Heinrich joined 311RS Motorsport to compete in the final round of the 2022 Porsche Carrera Cup North America, deputizing for Leh Keen. After crashing out of the first race of the weekend with brake problems, Heinrich won the second race.

Ahead of the 2023 season, Heinrich was promoted to contracted Porsche Driver status. Heinrich was also selected for financial support from the ADAC and DMSB as part of their Motorsport Team Germany program. With that backing, he took on a drive in the Deutsche Tourenwagen Masters for the first time in his career, piloting a Porsche 911 GT3 R for KÜS Team Bernhard. He supplemented his DTM program with a drive in the GT World Challenge Europe Endurance Cup with Rutronik Racing, joining Dennis Olsen and Thomas Preining in a Pro class entry.

Sim racing
Heinrich describes himself as a 'hybrid driver,' and he frequently competes in officially-sanctioned sim racing events alongside his real-world endeavors. From a young age, Heinrich competed in high-level virtual motorsports, taking part in the Blancpain GT Series on iRacing while competing in the real-world ADAC Formula 4 Championship. Heinrich also competed in the 2022–23 Le Mans Virtual Series, contributing to Porsche Team Coanda's championship victory with a victory at Sebring and a runner-up finish in the season finale at Le Mans.

Racing record

Career summary

* Season still in progress.

Complete Porsche Supercup results
(key) (Races in bold indicate pole position) (Races in italics indicate fastest lap)

References

External links
Laurin Heinrich at Motorsport.com
Laurin Heinrich at Heusinkveld

2001 births
Living people
German racing drivers
Racing drivers from Bavaria
ADAC Formula 4 drivers
Porsche Supercup drivers
24H Series drivers
Porsche Motorsports drivers
Porsche Carrera Cup Germany drivers
Deutsche Tourenwagen Masters drivers